The 1968–69 NCAA University Division men's basketball season began in December 1968, progressed through the regular season and conference tournaments, and concluded with the 1969 NCAA University Division basketball tournament championship game on March 22, 1969, at Freedom Hall in Louisville, Kentucky. The UCLA Bruins won their fifth NCAA national championship with a 92–72 victory over the Purdue Boilermakers.

Season headlines 

 The Associated Press (AP) Poll returned to a Top 20 format, expanding from the Top 10 format it used from the 1961–62 season through the 1967–68 season. It previously had used a Top 20 format from its inception in the 1948–49 season through the 1960–61 season.
 The NCAA tournament expanded from 23 to 25 teams. 
 UCLA won its third NCAA championship in a row, fifth overall, and fifth in six seasons. In the Pacific 8 Conference, it also won its third of what ultimately would be 13 consecutive conference titles.
 The Athletic Association of Western Universities (AAWU), informally known as the "Pacific 8," formally renamed itself the Pacific 8 Conference. It became the Pacific 10 Conference in 1978 and the Pac-12 Conference in 2011.
 The Southland Conference, founded in 1963, began NCAA University Division-level play.
 The Metropolitan Collegiate Conference was dissolved at the end of the season.

Season outlook

Pre-season polls 

The Top 20 from the AP Poll and Coaches Poll during the pre-season.

Conference membership changes

Regular season

Conference winners and tournaments

Informal championships

Statistical leaders

Post-season tournaments

NCAA tournament

Final Four 

 Third Place – Drake 104, North Carolina 84

National Invitation tournament

Semifinals & finals 
{{4TeamBracket | RD1=Semifinals | RD2=Finals
 | RD1-seed1= 
 | RD1-team1=Temple
 | RD1-score1=63
 | RD1-seed2= 
 | RD1-team2=Tennessee
 | RD1-score2=58
 | RD1-seed3= 
 | RD1-team3=Army
 | RD1-score3=61
 | RD1-seed4= 
 | RD1-team4=Boston College | RD1-score4=73
 | RD2-seed1= 
 | RD2-team1=Temple 
 | RD2-score1=89
 | RD2-seed2= 
 | RD2-team2=Boston College
 | RD2-score2=76
}}
 Third Place – Tennessee 64, Army 52

 Awards 

 Consensus All-American teams 

 

 Major player of the year awards 

 Naismith Award: Lew Alcindor, UCLA
 Helms Player of the Year: Lew Alcindor, UCLA
 Associated Press Player of the Year: Lew Alcindor, UCLA
 UPI Player of the Year: Lew Alcindor, UCLA
 Oscar Robertson Trophy (USBWA): Pete Maravich, LSU
 Sporting News Player of the Year: Lew Alcindor, UCLA

 Major coach of the year awards 

 Associated Press Coach of the Year: John Wooden, UCLA
 Henry Iba Award (USBWA): John Wooden, UCLA
 NABC Coach of the Year: John Wooden, UCLA
 UPI Coach of the Year: John Wooden, UCLA
 Sporting News Coach of the Year: John Wooden, UCLA

 Other major awards 

 Frances Pomeroy Naismith Award (Best player under 6'0): Billy Keller, Purdue
 Robert V. Geasey Trophy (Top player in Philadelphia Big 5): Ken Durrett, La Salle, & Howard Porter, Villanova
 NIT/Haggerty Award (Top player in New York City metro area):''' Jim McMillian, Columbia

Coaching changes 

A number of teams changed coaches during the season and after it ended.

References